Ubik is a 2000 single by the German electronic musician Timo Maas, featuring the vocals of Martin Bettinghaus. It reached #33 on the UK singles chart.

Track listing

UK CD 1
 "Ubik: The Breakz" (Radio Mix)
 "Ubik: The Breakz" (Original Mix)
 "Ubik: The Techno"

UK CD 2
 "Ubik: The Dance" (Radio Mix)
 "Ubik: The Dance" (Original Mix Instrumental)
 "Ubik: The Dance" (Original Mix)

UK 12" Double Vinyl
 "Ubik: The Breakz" (Original Mix)
 "Ubik: The Dance" (Original Mix)
 "Ubik: The Breakz" (Half Vocal Mix)
 "Ubik: The Dance" (Original Mix Instrumental)

 

2000 singles
Timo Maas songs
2000 songs
Perfecto Records singles
UK Independent Singles Chart number-one singles